Yeşilgölcük is a belde (town) in the central district (Niğde) of Niğde Province, Turkey. The population of Yeşilgölcük is 5144  as of 2011.

References

Populated places in Niğde Province
Towns in Turkey
Niğde Central District